John Smolenski (1891 – May 31, 1953) was an American businessman and politician from New York.

Life
He was born in 1891 in Poland. The family emigrated to the United States when John was still a small boy, and settled in Greenpoint, Brooklyn. Later he opened a funeral home at 1044 Manhattan Avenue there. He married Charlotte Garstkiewicz (1897–1961), and their only child was Irene (Smolenski) Imperatore.

Smolenski was a member of the New York State Assembly (Kings Co., 15th D.) in 1938, 1939–40, 1941–42, 1943–44, 1945–46, 1947–48, 1949–50, 1951–52 and 1953.

He died on May 31, 1953; and was buried at the First Calvary Cemetery in Queens.

Sources

External links
 

1891 births
1953 deaths
Democratic Party members of the New York State Assembly
Politicians from Brooklyn
20th-century American politicians
People from Greenpoint, Brooklyn